Keith Kahn-Harris is a sociologist and music critic. He is an honorary research fellow and senior lecturer at Birkbeck College and an associate fellow of the Institute for Jewish Policy Research and a lecturer at Leo Baeck College.

He has published academic and non-academic articles on Judaism, music scenes, heavy metal music, transgression, Israel, communities, dialogue, religion, ethnicity, political discourse, and denial.

Academic positions 
2008–09: Research Associate at the Centre for Urban and Community Research, Goldsmiths, University of London, working on project funded by the Economic and Social Research Council "Contemporary Anglo-Jewry and Leadership: Coping with Multiculturalism" (with Ben Gidley).
2007–08: Research Associate at the Centre for Urban and Community Research, Goldsmiths, working on two projects funded by the Rothschild Foundation Europe: "A Mapping Study of Efforts to Combat Antisemitism, Racism and Xenophobia at the Local, Communal and Grassroots Levels in Europe" (with Roger Hewitt) and "From Security to Insecurity?: Jewish Communal Leadership in Changing Times" (with Ben Gidley).
2005: Postdoctoral Fellow at the Advanced Cultural Studies Institute of Sweden, Campus Norrköping of Linköping University.
 2001–02: "Jerusalem Fellow" at the Mandel School for Advanced Educational Leadership in Jerusalem.

Select bibliography

Books written 
The Babel Message: A Love Letter to Language Icon Books, 2021
Strange Hate: Anti-semitism, racism, and the Limits of Diversity Repeater books, 2019 
Review, by Howard Cooper Jewish Chronicle, 18 June 2020
Denial: The Unspeakable Truth], Notting Hill Editions, 2018
 Uncivil War: The Israel Conflict in the Jewish Community, David Paul Books, 2014
Review by C Schindler, Jewish Journal of Sociology 56 (2014) 127–128. 
 All that Matters: Judaism, Hodder Education, 2012
 (co-written with Ben Gidley), Turbulent Times: The British Jewish Community Today Continuum 2010 
 Extreme Metal: Music and Culture on the Edge Berg 2007
Review:

Books edited
  (co-edited with Dougald Hine),Despatches from the Invisible Revolution New Public Thinking 2012
 (co-edited with Andy Bennett)  After subculture: Critical studies in contemporary youth culture  	Basingstoke Palgrave 2004

Refereed articles in scholarly journals
"Religious Popular Music: Between the Instrumental, Transcendent and Transgressive" in Temenos: Nordic Journal of Comparative Religion, 48/1, 87–106 2012
(With Ben Gidley) "Contemporary Anglo-Jewish and Community Leadership: Coping with Multiculturalism", British Journal of Sociology 63/1 2012
"Creating Jewish Rap: From Parody to Syncretism" in transversal – Zeitschrift für Jüdische Studien 1 2009 21–38
"The 'Failure' of Youth Culture: Music, Politics and Reflexivity in the Black Metal Scene" in European Journal of Cultural Studies, 7/1 2004, pp 95–111
Roots'?:  The Relationship Between the Global and the Local Within the Global Extreme Metal Scene" in Popular Music 19/1, 2000, pp 13–30

Journal special issues
(Co-edited with Titus Hjelm and Mark LeVine) "Heavy Metal: Controversies and Countercultures" Popular Music History 6: 1/2, April/August 2012
(Co-edited with Karl Spracklen and Andy R. Brown) "Metal Studies: Cultural Research in the Heavy Metal Scene" Journal for Cultural Research 15: 3, July 2011

Personal life
He is married to Rabbi Deborah Kahn-Harris, with whom he has two children.

References

External links 
 Official website
 Guardian profile: Keith Kahn-Harris
 New Statesman: Keith Kahn-Harris
 Interview in Metal Rules 
 

Year of birth missing (living people)
Living people
Academics of Birkbeck, University of London
Academics of the Open University
Academics of the Oxford Centre for Hebrew and Jewish Studies
British Jewish writers
British sociologists
British writers about music
Jewish sociologists
People associated with Leo Baeck College
Sociologists of religion